Across the Border is a 1922 American silent Western film directed by Charles R. Seeling and starring Guinn 'Big Boy' Williams, Patricia Palmer and William McCall.

Cast
 Guinn 'Big Boy' Williams as Andy Fowler 
 Patricia Palmer as Margie Landers
 William McCall as Phillip Landers
 Chet Ryan as Jim
 J. Gordon Russell as The Sheriff

References

External links
 

1922 films
1922 Western (genre) films
1920s English-language films
American black-and-white films
Films directed by Charles R. Seeling
Silent American Western (genre) films
1920s American films